Justin Courtney Pierre (born May 26, 1976) is a singer, songwriter and guitarist originally from Mahtomedi, Minnesota, United States. He is the co-founder and lead vocalist of the pop punk band Motion City Soundtrack, and is known for his interests and pursuits in film making and production of music.

Biography

Early life
Justin Pierre was raised in Mahtomedi, Minnesota. During his childhood, he enjoyed skateboarding and listening to hip-hop such as Run-DMC and the Beastie Boys. As a teen, Pierre became a big fan of alternative metal band Faith No More; in 1990 he regularly watched theirYou Fat Bastards videotape and the performance of frontman Mike Patton greatly influenced him. He would later mention the Faith No More album Angel Dust one of his favorite records of all time. Pierre studied at Mahtomedi High School, where he developed an interest in indie rock. During this time, Pierre quickly became an avid fan of bands such as Sonic Youth, The Boo Radleys, and The Pixies. Pierre played guitar and sang in a band called Slide Coaster, who released an album in 1995 titled Thrown. The group eventually disbanded, leaving Pierre to focus more on his hobby of making short films. However, his friend Joshua Cain convinced him to continue making music and recruited Pierre to join his band, which would eventually become Motion City Soundtrack.

Musical career
Justin Pierre formed Motion City Soundtrack in 1997 with friend Joshua Cain, becoming the lead singer as well as playing rhythm guitar. He and Cain both previously took stints on the moog synthesizer in the band, until the foundation of the current lineup. Pierre was the primary lyricist for the band, and visually became noted for his pronounced sideburns, wild hair and glasses (which are Kirk Originals).

Pierre has struggled with alcohol and substance abuse problems in the past, and during the recording of the album Commit This To Memory, he relapsed and binge drank due to the ending of a relationship. Pierre suffers from asthma, having to use his inhaler on stage at times.

The band released its fourth album, My Dinosaur Life, on January 19, 2010. Pierre was "trucking along on The Dino Trail" to promote the album. He began his promotional tour in Chicago on November 1 and was making his way around the United States doing "meet ups, impromptu performances, in store appearances, and other shenanigans that will surely ensue along the way."

The band's 5th album, Go, was released on June 12, 2012. The band's sixth album, Panic Stations, was released on September 18, 2015.

Film making
Pierre makes short films, went to Minneapolis Community and Technical College for film, but did not complete a degree. He now works on independent short films while at home, recording, and on tour. His most famous is titled "Karen" and was in a few film festivals early winter and spring 2007, including the 3rd annual Griffon International Film Festival (GIFF) and The Sacramento International Film Festival.

Pierre has been involved in the direction of music videos for fellow bands. He co-directed the music video for "Big Drag" by Limbeck, as well as co-directing with Shane Nelson the video for Sing It Loud's "No One Can Touch Us", which was produced by MCS' guitarist Joshua Cain.

Other works
In addition to singing for Motion City Soundtrack, Justin has sung guest vocals on Fall Out Boy's "Chicago is So Two Years Ago", Small Towns Burn A Little Slower's "Alias: The Bookkeeper", Metro Station's "Kelsey", Sing It Loud's "We're Not Afraid", The Rocket's "Shadow" (which he co-wrote with Joshua Cain and The Rocket) and is thought to have been heard singing numerous times on the Limbeck album Hi, Everything's Great. He also sings and helped write a song with Michigan City band, Grown Ups, called Are You Kitten Me?
and was featured in Revolution on Canvas, Volume 2: Poetry From the Indie Music Scene inputting a short story about the love and loss of a certain person in his life who was also addicted to alcohol. Pierre also produced two songs (along with Joshua Cain) on Metro Station's self-titled debut album.

Pierre recently joined sci-fi legend Lance Henriksen, horror icons Bill Moseley, Danielle Harris and Tiffany Shepis, as well as AFI's Davey Havok and Battlestar Galactica's Nicki Clyne in the cast of the "illustrated film" series Godkiller. Pierre voices the lead role of Tommy, a boy on a mission to save his dying sister in a post-nuclear wasteland.

Pierre is also in a band called Farewell Continental, which until recently he wasn't revealed as a member.  The group's first full-length album was released on May 10, 2011, followed by a United States tour.

Pierre and his wife, Lindsay Pierre, host a podcast called Book Narcs, in which the couple ask guests about their book history and interests.

Pierre and his wife welcomed their first child, a daughter named Max, in early 2015.

In 2017, Pierre announced The Rapture Twins, a rock collaboration between himself and Game Informer Executive Editor Andrew Reiner. The band's lyrics and branding reflect themes from the world of video games (including Overblood and the BioShock series). Their first single, "Would You Kindly?," was released on February 14, 2017. It was followed by the group's second single, "Eternity," which was released during Game Informer'''s November 2017 Extra Life charity event, with all proceeds from the single's sale going to Gillette Children's Specialty Healthcare.

Equipment
Pierre plays a variety of Fender Telecasters from Fender Telecaster Deluxes, to Fender Telecaster Customs to American Fender Telecasters. He has also played a Gibson SG in the past.

Discography

Solo
AlbumsIn the Drink (2018)

Extended playsOpen Mic At The Lo-Fi : Vol 1 (2019)An Anthropologist on Mars (2021)
 The Price of Salt (2021)
 Ghost World (2021)

with Motion City Soundtrack

 I Am the Movie (2003)
 Commit This to Memory (2005)
 Even If It Kills Me (2007)

 My Dinosaur Life (2010)
 Go (2012)
 Panic Stations (2015)

with Farewell Continental
 ¡Hey, Hey Pioneers! (2011)

with Slide CoasterThrown'' - EP (1995)

References 

1976 births
Living people
American rock singers
American male singer-songwriters
American rock guitarists
American male guitarists
People from Mahtomedi, Minnesota
Singer-songwriters from Minnesota
Motion City Soundtrack members
Guitarists from Minnesota
21st-century American singers
21st-century American guitarists
21st-century American male singers